Sruth in Aghaidh an Aird (Irish for "stream against the height"), sometimes called The Devil's Chimney, is Ireland’s highest waterfall, with a height of . It is in the Dartry Mountains in the west of Ireland, marking part of the border between County Sligo and County Leitrim.

It flows for around 200 days a year, from the southern side of the Darty Mountains plateau, into Glencar Lough. The waterfall's Irish name comes from the phenomenon where southerly winds sometimes blow the water backwards up and over the cliff edge. A public hiking trail has been established allowing access close to the base of the falls.

The waterfall is a prominent landmark, visible for many miles, and it formerly marked the ancient boundary of the túath of Cairbre Drom Cliabh, now the boundary between County Sligo and County Leitrim in the northern part of Connacht, the western province in Ireland.

References

Landforms of County Sligo
Landforms of County Leitrim
Waterfalls of the Republic of Ireland